Rafael Pineda may refer to:

 Rafael Pineda (television journalist) (born 1938), Cuban-American television news reporter and anchor
 Rafael Pineda (boxer) (born 1966), Colombian boxer